The Kushaverskoye peat railway is located in Novgorod Oblast, Russia.

Current status 
The Kushaverskoye peat railway's first line was constructed in 1967, in the area of Khvoyninsky District, Novgorod Oblast from the village Yubileyny to the swamp peat fields. The peat railway was built for hauling milling peat and workers and operates year-round.

Rolling stock

Locomotives 

 TU6D – № 0236
 TU6P – № 0013
 TU6A – № 3263, 3187
 ESU2A – № 568, 733, 822

Railroad car
Flatcar
Tank car
Snowplow
Tank car – fire train
Passenger car
Open wagon for peat
Hopper car to transport track ballast

Work trains 
Crane GK-5
Track laying cranes PPR2ma

Gallery

See also 
 Narrow-gauge railways in Russia

References and sources

External links 

 Official Website LLC «Kushavera peat» 
 Photo - project «Steam Engine» 
 «The site of the railroad» S. Bolashenko 

750 mm gauge railways in Russia
Rail transport in Novgorod Oblast